Japanese Railways may refer to:
 Japanese Government Railways
 Japanese National Railways

See also 

 Japan Railways Group
 Japanese railway signals
 Nippon Railway
 Rail transport in Japan